Manuel Carballo Martínez (born 23 November 1982) in Madrid, Spain is a Spanish artistic gymnast.

Carballo is from a renowned gymnastics family. His father Jesús Sr is the coach of the Spanish national women's team and his older brother Jesús Carballo Jr was a two time world champion. Another brother, Javier, is also involved in Gymnastics.

Carballo was the 2005 European Champion on the Parallel Bars with a score of 9.712. Manuel qualified in second place for the 2005 World Championships final on the event. Manuel performed a clean routine until his dismount, where a large stumble left him out of medal contention. Carballo has also won numerous medals at World Cup competitions. Carballo was a member of the Spanish team at the 2007 World Championships.

In 2008, Carballo was part of the Spanish Olympic Team, finishing 11th.

References

1982 births
Living people
Gymnasts from Madrid
Spanish male artistic gymnasts
Gymnasts at the 2008 Summer Olympics
Olympic gymnasts of Spain
Mediterranean Games gold medalists for Spain
Mediterranean Games bronze medalists for Spain
Competitors at the 2009 Mediterranean Games
Mediterranean Games medalists in gymnastics
European champions in gymnastics
20th-century Spanish people
21st-century Spanish people